is a text adventure developed and published by Square for the NEC PC-8801, NEC PC-9801, and Fujitsu FM-7 in 1984. The game and its supporting computer platforms were only released in Japan. The Death Trap is the first game developed by Square, created before they were even an independent company. At the time, Square was a software branch of Den-Yu-Sha, a Japanese power line manufacturing firm; it was not until 1986 that Square was independently established.

Square released a sequel in 1985 called Will: The Death Trap II. Square's third and final text adventure game was called Alpha, released in 1986, and tells a science fiction story in the same style as The Death Trap.

Gameplay
The Death Trap is a silent (no sound) text parser adventure game, which relies on simple command lines from the user's input to progress through the game. As opposed to most "text adventures", with only text as output, The Death Trap provides graphical feedback using full screen still images.

Plot
The game's plot revolves around a spy in an African country during a civil war. The story also involves biological warfare.

The game's plot is set during the 1980s. In the game, the Cold War has become tense, and many countries have begun to prepare for a global-scale war, working on new weapons. One of such countries is the mysterious "B country" in Eastern Africa, which in an attempt to create biological weapons kidnaps the famous scientist Dr. Gitanes. An agent named Benson is sent to B country in order to rescue the doctor and avert the new threat to world peace.

Development
The Death Trap was the first game developed by Square, a computer game software branch of Den-Yū-Sha Electric Company. Masashi Miyamoto, who founded Square in September 1983, believed that it would be more efficient to have graphic designers, programmers and writers work together on common projects. Upon Square's inception, Miyamoto initially hired as their first developers university students Hironobu Sakaguchi and Hiromichi Tanaka, and a few others. They shortly began work on Square's first game, The Death Trap. Sakaguchi noted in 1985 that he had expected to only do clerical work, not develop video games, yet was appointed a producer for the game. Sakaguchi was also a scenario writer for The Death Trap even though he too was a part time employee who had just left university. Harunobu Kato and Tanaka served as programmers. Other scenario writers were 雪ノ浦美樹, 林明弘 and 鈴木尚志. The graphics team consisted of Hiromi Nakada, 雪ノ浦美樹, 今泉美保 and 斉藤智子. Lastly, 井出康代 held the position of data editing. During the creation of The Death Trap all of Squares’ staff were part time. Halfway through development, Sakaguchi reached out to a part time cassette rental store employee named Nobuo Uematsu that Sakaguchi had previously met and received a demo tape from. The game was published in Japan for the NEC PC-8801 in October 1984. It was later released for the Fujitsu FM-7 in December 1984. The game was the first game released in Japan that allowed both Japanese and English text entry during gameplay, as all previous Japanese games were done in English to be like games released on the Apple II. During this period, The Death Trap was one of three games that made within two years, which was a fast pace of development. There were two editions of the game with two different cover arts, the first of which is now super rare. The game was unique among titles of the time for introducing full-screen images.

Reception
The Death Trap received little attention at the time of release, though it was successful enough for Square to immediately go on to create a sequel: Will: The Death Trap II. Hironobu Sakaguchi, Hiromichi Tanaka, Harunobu Kato and Hiromi Nakada continued developing games for Square, while the rest of those credited left.

Retrospective examination from PC Gamer called the game's art “rudimentary”. USGamer described the plot as a Cold War era spy thriller.

Project EGG, a licensed emulator for home computer games, included The Death Trap, Will, and Alpha together in its limited edition "Classic PC-Game Collection" on September 8, 2013, alongside Cruise Chaser Blassty and Genesis—other Square games released between 1984 and 1987.

Legacy

 is a video game developed and published by Square for the NEC PC-8801, NEC PC-9801, Fujitsu FM-7, and Sharp X1 in 1985. The game and its supporting computer platforms were released exclusively in Japan. Will is the sequel to The Death Trap, and was Square's second release.

Sakaguchi once again wrote the game's scenario, and has explained that he used The Death Trap as the basis of the game and “beefed up the story, the universe, and the game system” for the sequel. Much like its predecessor, Will is an interactive fiction game, which relies on simple command lines from the user's input to progress through the game. As opposed to the earlier "text adventures", with only text as output, Will provides graphical feedback by using pictures. Square recruited a postgraduate student from Keio University to program the bitmap graphics of Will. The game is considered one of the first animated computer games.

Will sold 100,000 copies in Japan, which, while less than its predecessor, was a major commercial success at the time of its release. The game is also considered Square's first hit.

Notes

References

External links
 
 
 

1980s interactive fiction
1984 video games
FM-7 games
Japan-exclusive video games
NEC PC-8801 games
NEC PC-9801 games
Sharp X1 games
Square Enix franchises
Square (video game company) games
Video games developed in Japan
Video games scored by Nobuo Uematsu
Video games set in Africa
Visual novels